Turritella gemmata is a species of sea snail, a marine gastropod mollusk in the family Turritellidae.

Description

Distribution
This species can be found from Cocobeach to Libreville (Gabon)

References

Endemic fauna of Gabon
Turritellidae
Gastropods described in 1849